Slidell Airport  is a city-owned public-use airport located four nautical miles (7 km) northwest of the central business district of Slidell, a city in St. Tammany Parish, Louisiana, United States.

Although most U.S. airports use the same three-letter location identifier for the FAA and IATA, this airport is assigned ASD by the FAA but has no designation from the IATA (which assigned ASD to Andros Town Airport on Andros Island in the Bahamas).

Facilities and aircraft 

It has one runway designated 18/36 with a 5,001 by 100 ft (1,524 x 30 m) asphalt surface.

The Louisiana Office of the National Weather Service is colocated here.

For the 12-month period ending April 15, 2008, the airport had 112,000 aircraft operations, an average of 306 per day: 96% general aviation, 4% military. At that time there were 86 aircraft based at this airport: 87% single-engine, 9% multi-engine, 2% helicopter and 1% jet.

References

External links 
 

Airports in Louisiana
Buildings and structures in St. Tammany Parish, Louisiana
Transportation in St. Tammany Parish, Louisiana
Slidell, Louisiana
Airports in the New Orleans metropolitan area
Transportation in the New Orleans metropolitan area